Thomas Michael Mikula (September 26, 1926 – March 24, 2014) was a professional American football player for the All-America Football Conference's Brooklyn Dodgers. He played running back in one game during the 1948 season.  Mikula played college football at William & Mary as a walk-on. He died at the age of 87 in 2014.

References

1926 births
2014 deaths
American football running backs
Brooklyn Dodgers (AAFC) players
Sportspeople from Johnstown, Pennsylvania
Sportspeople from Williamsburg, Virginia
Players of American football from Pennsylvania
William & Mary Tribe football players